The Olivetti P6040 was a personal computer, described by its maker as a personal minicomputer. The P6040 was programmable in Mini BASIC and featured a floppy disk drive that used proprietary 2.5-inch sleeveless disks called "Minidisk". It was produced starting from 1977 and was the first microprocessor-based Olivetti computer, the Intel 8080, instead of on TTL logic CPU.

Designed by Pier Giorgio Perotto, it was presented at Hannover Messe in April 1975 together with the P6060, its hardware used TTL technology. Both had a brown-colored case.

The P6040 was little in dimensions and weight, thanks to the introduction of microprocessor (for the first time at Olivetti).

Another innovation in the model was the introduction of the light-emitting diode display. The design was by Mario Bellini.

See also 
 Olivetti

Bibliography 
 (it) La minimizzazione delle grammatiche libere da contesto, Angelo Monfroglio - Politecnico di Milano, 20 dicembre 1974

References 

Olivetti personal computers
Computer-related introductions in 1975